Susan Evans McCloud (born July 28, 1945) is an American novelist, author, poet, hymnwriter, and member of the Church of Jesus Christ of Latter-day Saints (LDS Church).

Biography
McCloud has lived much of her adult life in Provo, Utah. She is the mother of six children. She is an active member of the Daughters of Utah Pioneers,  and other materials for the LDS Church. She and her family are deeply involved in their Scottish heritage. Her only son plays the bagpipes, and was featured in "A Celebration of Family History" held in the LDS Conference Center in April 2010. She was a docent at Brigham Young's Beehive House in Salt Lake City for over 20 years, and docent for the Etruscan Exhibit at the Brigham Young University Museum of Art.

McCloud was a member of Joseph A. Cannon's 1992 Utah County Steering Committee when he was seeking the Republican Nomination for Senate.

In 2004, McCloud was given the Reed Smoot Citizenship Awards business women of the year award.

Publications

Music
Two of McCloud's hymns appear in the LDS Church's 1985 hymnbook. One of these, "Lord I Would Follow Thee," has also been recorded by the Tabernacle Choir at Temple Square. Lines from this hymn have been quoted in the community, and it has even been called "one of the best-loved songs in the LDS Church"  McCloud wrote her other hymn, "As Zion's Youth in Latter Days," with the goal of giving strength to a "vacillating youth."

McCloud has also contributed to film music used by the LDS Church's seminaries.

Writing
McCloud has published more than 45 books.  Since the late 1970s she has published nearly one novel annually, many through the publishers Bookcraft or Scribe Publishing.  Her novel Black Stars Over Mexico was a best seller in January 1985.  Brigham Young: An Inspiring Personal Biography was partly developed as a result of her 30 years as a docent at the Beehive House. ].

Many of her novels are historical fiction of 19th-century Latter-day Saints in far-flung places, such as England or India.  Some reviewers have criticized her novels as being pro-Mormon and repetitious of previous themes, but she is known for her strong characters and the power of her descriptions. .  Her work has been reviewed by Dialogue: A Journal of Mormon Thought  Although rejected by some critics, her work is praised by others, such as LDS commentator and Deseret News columnist Jerry Johnston.

McCloud's poetry first appeared in the Ensign magazine in 1972.

McCloud has also written scripts for film and TV productions, including the script for making one of her books into a made-for-TV movie.
In the late 1960s Susan wrote by-line feature articles for the Dixon Evening Telegraph in Dixon, Illinois, the home town of President Ronald Reagan.

References

External links
 Mentioned in Lavina Fielding Anderson (1994) "Utah Literature". Utah History Encyclopedia.
 

1945 births
20th-century American novelists
20th-century American poets
20th-century American women writers
American Latter Day Saint hymnwriters
American Latter Day Saint writers
American women novelists
American women poets
Latter Day Saint poets
Living people
Writers from Provo, Utah
Songwriters from Utah
American women hymnwriters
Novelists from Utah
American women non-fiction writers
20th-century American non-fiction writers
21st-century American women